Korbut may refer to:

Aleksei Korbut (born 1981), Russian football player
Ekaterina Korbut (born 1985), Russian chess player, a Woman Grandmaster 
Olga Korbut (born 1955), Belarusian, Soviet-born gymnast
Korbut Flip, two gymnastics skills named after Olga Korbut